The Franchise is another name for suffrage.

The Franchise may also refer to:

The Franchise (band), a rock band from Washington D.C.
The Franchise (novel), 1983
The Franchise (TV series), a television show on Showtime
WFNZ (AM), branded as "The Franchise" from 2003–2009

People nicknamed "The Franchise"
Tom Seaver (1944–2020), Major League Baseball Hall of Fame pitcher
Sting (wrestler) (born 1959), professional wrestler
Shane Douglas (born 1964), professional wrestler
David Reutimann (born 1970), NASCAR driver
Steve Francis (born 1977), NBA player
Francisco Liriano (born 1983), Major League Baseball pitcher
Tim Lincecum (born 1984), Major League Baseball pitcher

See also
Franchise